Paolo de Maio or Paolo de Majo (15 January 1703 – 20 April 1784) was an Italian painter of the late-Baroque or Rococo period.

Biography
Paolo de Maio was born in Marcianise, province of Caserta, in the region of Campania. His brother Ludovico de Majo (born in Maricianise on 12 October 1695) was also a painter.

Paolo de Maio was a pupil of Francesco Solimena in Naples. He was prolific in Naples, painting the cupola and around the windows for the church of Santa Maria Egiziaca a Forcella; a San Domenico (1742) for the church of Gesù e Maria at Corso Umberto; a San Niccolò (1772) for the church of Santa Maria delle Grazie a Caponapoli; the Four Evangelists for the church of Trinità in via Roma; as well as frescoes for the ceiling of the church of Monte Cassino.

He painted a canvas depicting San Gennaro for a church in Mugnano del Cardinale, as well as Evangelists (1782) for the church of Verginiani in Casamarciano. He painted a number of canvases in the 1760s for the church of the Camaldoli of Nola (Visciano).

Paolo de Maio died in Naples.

References

External links
 

1704 births
1784 deaths
People from Marcianise
18th-century Italian painters
Italian male painters
Painters from Naples
Italian Baroque painters
18th-century Italian male artists